Peroshah or Pero Shah is a historical village and union council in Gujrat District, Pakistan, about  from the district headquarters of Gujrat.

There is a government high school in the village.

References

Populated places in Gujrat District